The Palette and Chisel Academy of Fine Art is an association of representational artists, founded in Chicago in 1895. Palette & Chisel is the second oldest artist organization in the United States.

Founding
As the Inland Printer reported in June 1896:
An association of artists and craftsmen for the purpose of work and study—such is the Palette and Chisel Club of Chicago. The organization is unique in that its members are all wage-workers and busy during the week with pencil, brush or chisel, doing work to please other people. But on Sunday mornings, at 9 o'clock, they assemble in the studio of Lorado Taft, in the Athenaeum Building, and for five hours each amuses himself by working in his chosen medium, to suit himself.

Two-thirds of the members are students in the "life class" at the Art Institute of Chicago night school, and a desire for opportunity to study from the model in daylight, so that color might be used, led to the organization of the club.

The following is a list of the club's membership: Charles J. Mulligan (later head of the sculpture department at the Art Institute),  David Hunter and W. J. Hutchinson, sculptors; Ray Brown, chief of the Times-Herald art department, and F. Holme, of the Evening-Post; Henry Hutt, illustrator and designer for J. Manz & Co.; Carl Mauch, of the Werner Company's art staff; Will Carqueville, poster designer and lithographer; Curtis Gandy, Capel Rowley, Richard Boehm, Edward Loewenheim and C.C. Senf, designers and illustrators; L. Pearson, F.J. Thwing and H.L. Bredtschneider, fresco painters and decorators; Fred Mulhaupt, display advertiser; Ancel Cook, scenic artist; A. Sterba and W.H. Irvine, portrait artists; Arthur Carr, H. Wagner, L.M. Coakley and J.S. Shippen, art students. Fred Larson is a "proofer", and the printer's trade is represented by W.A. Randall.

Early years
The founding members were principally evening students at the Art Institute of Chicago. Charles J. Mulligan, an assistant to sculptor Lorado Taft, was able to persuade Taft to rent the organization part of his seventh floor studio on Van Buren Street in Chicago.

Early supporters of the organization included: Charlie Russell and George Bellows. The Palette & Chisel served as the artistic home of  James Topping  Walter Ufer, and Eugene Savage. In 1921, with the help of founding member, Fred Larson, who mortgaged his home for this purpose, the club purchased the mansion at 1012 N. Dearborn Street where it still resides. In 1933, the organization changed its name to the "Palette and Chisel Academy of Fine Art", as it became an educational, not-for-profit institution.

Early  members of note included: 
Carl Brandner (1898-1961) 
Benjamin Blessum (1877- 1954) 
Walter Marshall Clute (1870-1915) 
John Carl Doemling (1894-1955) 
Frank Dudley (1868-1957) 
J. Jeffrey Grant (1883-1960) 
Oskar Gross (1871-1963) 
Victor Higgins (1884-1949) 
Frank Holme (?-1904) 
Wilson Irvine (1869-1936) 
Thomas A. O'Shaughnessy (1870-1956) 
Karl Ouren (1882-1943) 
Edgar Alwin Payne (1883–1947)  
Emory Seidel (1881- ) 
Joseph Tomanek (1889-1974) 
Walter Ufer (1876-1936)
Nicola Veronica (1905-1979)

Recent years
Recent members of note have included: Fred Berger (1931-2006), Charles Vickery (1913-1998), and  Richard Schmid. Currently the academy offers over 30 hours of live model workshops per week, and several classes in traditional oil painting, watercolor, figure sculpture, figure drawing, and anatomy.

See also
 Visual arts of Chicago

External links
 Official Website
This Old Palette blog site
Annual Exhibit: 1930
Gold Medal Winners 1913-1987
Palette and Chisel Club records at The Newberry 

Artist groups and collectives based in Chicago
Arts organizations established in 1895
1895 establishments in Illinois